Santhakumari is an Indian actress best known for her work in Malayalam cinema. She has acted in more than 250 films, dramas, television serials and short films.

Biography
Santhakumari was born to Narayanan and Karthyayani, as eighth child among ten children, at Kochi, Kerala.  She had her primary education from Thevara C.C.P.L.M High school, Ernakulam. She was married to Late Velayudhan and have two daughters. She was presented with a house named "Snehaveedu" in 2012 by Malayalam Movie Artists Assoaciation (AMMA). She received Kerala State film Award for Best Actress in 1977 for Chuvanna Vithukal.

Awards
 1977 Kerala State Film Award for Best Actress – Chuvanna Vithukal
 2009 World Malayalee Council India region & Kairali Channel Award
 2011 Kerala Film Critics Association Awards – Chalachithra Prathibha Award

Partial filmography

Oru Ordinary Pranayam
Jannath
 Peter
 John Abraham
 Kalanju Poya Vithu
 Water Oru Parinamam
 Katha Parayum Muthachan
 Madhuramee Jeevitham 
 Maanam Thelinjathu
 Nanma Niranja Umma 
 Kumari (2022) as Kunjamma Pillai
 Nipah (2022)  as
 He... A Terrorist  – Short film (2022)  
 Aquarium (2022) as Chettathi
 Njan Ponmutta Idunna Poovan Kozhi – Short film 
 Pappantem Simontem Piller (2021)
Kaaval (2021) as Leelamma
 Sara's (2021) as Servant
 Chavara Pithavinte Chavarulukal (2021) as Sudhaamma
 Illam (2021) as Bhavani
 Makkanna (2019) 
 Vikruthi (2019) as Bystander
 Safe (2019) as Old lady in court
 Muthassikkoru Muthu (2019) 
 Vishudha Pusthakam (2019)  as Umaiba
Soothrakkaran (2019) 
 Daivam Saakshi (2019) as Sethu's mother
Mr and Ms Rowdy (2019) as Valyammechi
 Neeyum Njanum (2019) as Tajitha
Panthu (2019) as Sudheesh's mother
Vallikettu (2019) as Santhamma
 Madhurameeyathra (2018) 
 Eliyammachiyude Aadyathre Christmas (2018) as Kunjannamma
Nonsense (2018) as T.P. Annamma
 Shirkh (2018) as Aayisha
Kenalum Kinarum (2018) 
Mattanchery (2018)
 Parole (2018) as Villager 
 Planner (2018) as Ponnamaa
 Khaleefa (2018)
 Mannam Kattayum Kariyilayum (2017) as Raghu's mother
 Pareeth Pandari (2017) as Officer
 The Crab (2017) as Servant
 Devayanam (2017)
 Thoppil Joppan (2016) as Roslin's grandmother
 IDI (2016) as Midwife
 Leela (2016) as Chengalam Omana
 Noolpaalam (2016) as Muthassi
 Kaadhaantharam (2016) as Sarasamma
 Wonderful Journey (2016) as Kuriakose's mother
 Plus or Minus (2016) as Kalyaniyamma
 Aruthe (2016) 
 Subhayathra (2016) - Short film
 Paulettante Veedu (2016) as Santhakumari
 Ottakolam (2016) as Kamakshi Amma
 Pithaavinum Puthranum Parishudhaathmaavinum  
 Life Of Josutty (2015)  Geevarghese's mother
 Rudrasimhaasanam (2015) as Servant
 Alif (2015) as Abu's mother
 Thousand (2015) as Janakiyamma
 White Boys (2015) 
 Nadi (2015) as Saraswathiyamma
 Sarathi (2015) as Rajani's mother in law
 Iruvazhi Thiriyunnidam (2015)
  Namukkore Aakaasham
 Ente Cinema - The Movie Festival (2015) 
 Moonam Naal (2015)
 Iruvazhi Thiriyunnidam (2015)
 Seconds (2014) as Firoz's grandmother
 Nerariyathe (2014) – Short film 
 To Noora with Love (2014) as Sreeparvathi's grandmother
 God's Own Country (2014) as Vakkachan's mother
 Thomsonvilla (2014) as School Principal/Nun
 1983 (2014) as  Mariyamma
 Iniyum Ethra Dooram (2014) as Muthassi
 Ponnarayan (2014) as Raghavan's mother
 Pranayakatha (2014) as Elamma 
 Maramkothi (2014) 
 Avarude Veedu (2014)  
 Weeping Boy (2013) as Sahadevan's mother
 Cleopatra (2013) as Bhavani
 Olipporu (2013) as Teacher
 Pothumaappu (2013) as Sathar's mother
 ABCD: American-Born Confused Desi (2013) as Colony lady
 Housefull (2013) as Leelamani
 Romans (2013) as Papi's wife
 Ezhamathe Varavu (2013) as Tribal Woman
 Radio (2013)
 Ee Adutha Kaalathu (2012) as Vishnu's mother
 Madirasi (2012) as Janakiyamma
 Oru Kudumba Chithram (2012) as Mallika's care taker
 Parudeesa (2012) as Johny's mother
 Thanichalla Njan (2012) as Antharjanam
 Masters (2012) as Milan's grandmother
 Thappana (2012) as Patient
 Happy Durbar (2011) as Nelson's mother
 Scene No.001 (2011) as Manikantan's mother
 Sundara Kalyanam (2011) as Shajahan's umma
 Ninnishtam Ennishtam 2 (2011) as
 Swargam Nine Kilometer (2011)
 Dhaanam (2011)
 Fiddle (2010) as Dakshayini
 Holidays (2010) as Bus passenger
 Kadaksham (2010) as Servant 
 Kadha Thudarunnu (2010) as Lasar's wife
 Thaskara Lahala (2010) as Mani's mother
 Njaan Sanchaari (2010) as Devassy's wife 
 Venalmaram (2009) as Kamalakshi
 Bhagyadevatha (2009) as Nabeezumma
 Meghatheertham (2009) 
 Gopalapuranam (2008) as Bhavaniyamma
 Kanichukulangarayil CBI (2008) as Bank customer
 Innathe Chintha Vishayam (2008) as Amina
 Kanal Kannaadi (2008) 
 Kangaroo (2007) as Janamma
 Sketch (2007) as Nadhiya's umma
 Sooryakireedam (2007) as Januvamma
 Nivedyam (2007) as Amminiyamma
 Komban (2007) as Radha's mother
 Smart City (2006) as Santhamma
 Palunku (2006) as Lalitha
 Chakkara Muthu (2006) as Servant
 Mukhamariyaathe (2006) as Velu's wife
 Ponumudi Puzhayorathu (2006)
 Mahasamudram (2006) as Santha
 Bharathchandran I.P.S.(2005) as Muslim lady
 Otta Nanayam (2005) as Beggar
 Hai (2005) as Sekharan's mother 
 The Tiger (2005) as Venu's wife
 Thaalamelam (2004) as Nun
 Sathyam  (2004) as Raju's mother 
 Rasikan (2004) as Ramabhadran's mother
 Sasneham Sumithra (2004) Lady at temple
 Janakeeyam (2003) as Ravi's mother
 Manassinakkare (2003) as Aliyamma
 Ammakilikkoodu (2003) as Inmate of the old age home
 Natturajavu (2003) as Rubber tapping worker
 Akhila (2002) as Sharada
 Thilakam (2002) as Savithri
 Jagathy Jagadeesh in Town (2002) as Nurse Santhadevi 
 Sthree Vesham (2002) as Swamini Amma
 Njaan Raajaavu (2002) as Thomas's mother
 Thamaasha Veeran (2002)
 Swararaagaganga (2002)
 Nakshathragal Parayathirunnathu (2001) as Devamma
 Dupe Dupe Dupe (2001) as Balu's mother
 Chenchaayam (2001) as Malu's mother
 Raajapattam (2001)
 Spiderman (2001)
 Valiettan (2000) as Kuttikrishnan Nair's wife
 Nishasurabhikal (2000) as Reetha
 Crime File (1999) as Sr. Fisto
 Auto Brothers (1999) as Aarifa
 Ustaad (1999) as Devakiyamma
 Janani (1999) as Eliyamma
 Veendum Chila Veettukaryangal (1999) as  Bhavana's mother
 Mangalya Pallakku (1998)  as Seethalakshmi's mother
 Meenathil Thalikkettu (1998) as Malathi's mother
 Aanappara Achamma (1998)
 Poonilamazha (1997) as Ammu
 Kalyaana Unnikal (1997) as Krishnanunni's mother
 Maanikyakkoodaaram (1997)
Harbour (1996) as Beevathumma
Kaliveedu (1996) as Treesa 
 Azhakiya Ravanan (1996) as Sharath's mother
 Excuse Me Ethu Collegila (1996) as Appukuttan's mother
 Kanakkinavu (1996) as Aalikka's wife
 Thoovalkottaram (1996) as Paarukutty
 Aksharam (1995) as House owner
 Sundari Neeyum Sundaran Njanum (1995) as Indu's mother
 Praayikkara Paappan (1995) as Gouri mother
 Ezharakkoottam (1995) as Jaanuvamma
 Sundharimare Sookshikkuka (1995) as Rema's mother
 Shilpi (1995) as Rahul's mother
 No. 1 Snehatheeram Bangalore North (1995) as Servant 
 Mazhayethum Mumpe (1995)
 Chantha (1995)
 Pavithram (1994) as Madhavan's mother 
 Nandini Oppol (1994) as Maya's mother
 Pingami (1994) as Sreedevi's mother
 Malappuram Haji Mahanaya Joji (1994) as Joji's mother
 Sagaram Sakshi (1994) as Narayanan's wife
 Parinayam (1994)  as Madhavan's mother
 Bharya as Babukuttan's mother
 Chakoram (1994) as Madhavi
 Bheeshmacharya (1994) 
 Sraadham (1994)
 Chenkol (1993) as Devi's mother
 Sthalathe Pradhana Payyans (1993) as Saraswathy
 Koushalam (1993) as Gopi's mother
 Narayam (1993) as Sethulakshmi
 Thirasheelakku Pinnil - Neelachithrangalkkethire (1993)
 Golantharavartha (1993) as Headmistress
 Aagneyam (1993) as Mammali's mother
 Ithu Manjukaalam (1993) as Savithri
 Customs Diary (1993)
 Ponnuchami (1993)
 Journalist (1993)
 Sooryachakram (1992) as Lakshmi
 Kamaladalam (1992) as Malavika's mother
 Sargam (1992) as Thankamani's mother
 Pappayude Swantham Appoos (1992) as Servant
 Vietnam Colony (1992) as Colony inmate
 Ayalathe Addeham (1992) as Rajiv's mother
 Ennodishtam Koodamo (1992) as Jinachandran's mother
 Aayushkalam (1992) as Sujatha's mother
 Kizhakkan Pathrose (1992) as Drama artist
 Sooryamansasam (1992) 
 Raajashilpi (1992)
 Savidham (1992)
 Venalkkinaavukal (1991) as Lakshmi
 Uncle Bun (1991) as Sister 1
 Veendum Oru Aadyarathri (1991) as
 Parallel College (1991) as Bhargavi
 Kaakkathollaayiram (1991) as Jameela
 Orutharam Randutharam Moonnutharam (1991) as Devayani
 Nagarathil Samsara Vishayam (1991)
 Raid (1991)
 Khandakavyam (1991)
 Daiva Sahayam Lucky Center (1991)
 Thoovalsparsham (1990) as Nun
 His Higness Abdullah (1990) as Saraswathi
 Oliyambukal (1990) as Tribal lady
 Kalikkalam (1990) as Rosi
 Aaraam Waardil Aabhyanthara Kalaham (1990)
 Thazhvaram (1990)
 Oru Sayahnathinte Swapnam (1989) as
 Crime Branch (1989) as Lakshmiyamma
 Puthiya Karukkal (1989) as Leelamma
 Utharam (1989) as Nurse
 Adikuruppu (1989) as Basheer's mother
 Season (1989) as Porinchu's mother
 Muthukudayum Choodi (1989) as Gayathri's mother
 Varnatheru  (1989) as Urmila's mother
 Ashokante Ashwathykuttikku (1989) as Nabeesumma
 Mudra (1989) as Bharathiyamma
 Kaliyuga Seetha (1989)
 Eenam Maranna Kaattu (1989)
 Oh My Rosy (1989)
 Rathibhavam (1989)
 Avaloru Sindhu (1989) 
 Onninu Purake Mattonnu (1988) as Ambujam.
 Ormayilennum (1988) as Janakiyamma
 Kudumbapuranam (1988) as Indu's mother
 Kireedam (1988) as Devi's mother
 Abkari (1988) as Drunkard's mother
 Chaaravalayam (1988) as Asha
 Innaleyude Bakki (1988) as Nun
 Paadhamudra (1988)
 Janmasathru (1988)
Theekattu (1987) as Jayadevan's mother
 Ithrayum Kalam (1987) as Antharjanam
 Hridubetham (1987) as Vinodiniyamma
Aankiliyude Tharattu (1987) as Sarada
 Sreedharante Onnam Thirumurivu (1987) as Sadasivan's wife
 Thoovanathumbikal (1987) as Radha's mother
 Kalam Mari Katha Mari (1987) as Razzak's mother
 Adimakal Udamakal (1987) as Sarada
 Archanappookkal (1987) as Raji's mother
 Yaagangni (1987) as Murdered lady
 Nirabhedangal (1987) as Jayadevan's mother
 Naalkkavala (1987) as Leela
 P.C. 369 (1987)
 Nadodikatuu (1987)
 Ivare Sookshikkuka (1987)
 Aavanazhi (1986) as Radhas' mother
 Abhayam Thedi (1986) as Parukutty
 Ambadi Thannilorunni (1986) as Susheela
 Ente Entethu Mathram (1986) as Kalyaniyamma
 Gandhinagar 2nd Street (1986) as Madhavan's mother
 Veendum (1986) as Sukumari
 Surabheeyamangal (1986) as Murali's mother
Ithramathram (1986) as Chithra's mother
 Vaartha (1986) as Ammukutty
 Kochuthemmaadi (1986) as Naniyamma
 Ilanjippookkal (1986) as Sumithra's mother
 Chilambu (1986)) as Paramu's mother
 Ice - cream (1986) as Ponnamma
 Railway Cross (1986) as Ratheesh's adopted mother
 Ambili Ammaavan (1986)
 Sukhamo Devi (1986)
 Urukku Manushyan (1986)
 Sakhavu (1986)
 Thidambu (1986)
 Bhagavan (1986)
 Meenamasathile Sooryan (1986)
 Arrest (1986)
 Rangam (1985) as Appunni's mother
 Sammelanam (1985) as Basheer's mother
 Vilichu Vili Kettu (1985) as Rema's mother
 Mounam Nombaram (1985) as Ammu
 Madhuvidhu Theerum Munpe (1985) as Maria 
 Oru Naal Innorunaal (1985) as Sridevi's mother
 Idanilangal (1985) as Subhadra's mother
 Snehicha Kuttathinu (1985) as Kausalya
 Kayyum Thalayum Purathidaruthu (1985) as Saradha
 Thozhil Allengil Jail (1985)
 Paara (1985)
 Ormikkan Omanikkan (1985)
 Sreekrishna Parunthu (1984) as Servant
 Aattuvanchi Ulanjappol (1984) as Janaki
 Onnum Mindatha Bharya (1984) as Parvathy
 Ethirppukal (1984) as Mariya
 Mynaakam (1984)  as Janakiyamma
Kurishuyudham (1984) as Annamma Nurse
 Itha Innu Muthal (1984) as Santhamma 
 Thirakal (1984) as Rekha's mother 
 Manasariyathe (1984) as Mammoootty's mother
 Poochakkoru Mookkuthi (1984) as Kalyani
 Vanitha Police (1984) as Bhavani
 Ahankaram (1984) as Radhika's mother
 Veendum Chalikkunna Chakram (1984) as Devakiyamma
 Idavelakku Shesham (1984) as Naniyamma
 Nishedi (1984)  as Mrs. Rajasekharan
 Karimbu (1984) as Alex's mother
 Gurudakshina (1984) as Hostel warden
 Unaroo (1984) as Pathrose's mother
 Enta Nandhinikutty (1984)
 Oru Thettinte Katha (1984)
 Vetta (Kombu) (1984)
 Anthichuvappu (1984)
 Oru Mukham Pala Mukham (1983) as Rajamma
 Visa (1983) as Kuttyalikka' mother
 Prem Nazeerine Kaanmaanilla (1983) as Bhargavi
 Ashtapadi (1983) as Warassiar
 Thalaam Thettiya Thaarattu (1983) as Saradha
 Omanathingal (1983) as Nani
 Shesham Kazhchayil (1983) as Lathika's mother
 Naseema (Thamburu) (1983) as Ravi's mother
 Aattakkalaasham (1983) as Naniyamma
 Rugma (1983) as Januvamma
 Maniyara (1983) as Devootee at Ajmeer
 Onnu Chirikku (1983) as Rohini's mother
 Engine Nee Marakkum (1983) as Kunji
 Nizhal Moodiya Nirangal (1983) as Thresya
 Rathilayam (1983) as Rathi's mother
 Iniyenkilum (1983) as Geetha's mother
 Theeram Thedunna Thira (1983)  Sudhakaran's mother
 Aa Rathri (1983) as Nun
 Ahankaaram (1983) as Radhika's mother
 Onnu Chirikku (1983) as Rohini's mother
 Kattathe Kilikkoodu (1983) as Meenakshi
 Aaroodham (1983) as Naniyamma
 Deeparadhana (1983) as Dakshayini
 Surumayitta Kannukal (1983) as Amina
 Vaashi (1983)
 Kathi (1983)
 Swapna Lokam (1983)
 Sandhya Mayangum Neram (1983)
 Kinginikkombu (1983)
 Ithu Njangalude Kadha (1982) as Johny's mother
 Innallenkil Naale (1982) as Radha 
 Postmortem (1982) as Lakshmi 
 Snehapoorvam Meera (1982) as Achamma
 Saravarsham (1982) as Lakshmi Amma
 Ee Nadu (1982) as Dakshyayani
 Ithiri Neram Othiri Kaaryam (1982) as Vimala's mother
 Enthino Pookkunna Pookkal (1982) as Madhavi
 Kanmanikkorumma (1982) as Kalyani
 Oru Kunju Janikkunnu (1982)
 Kazhumaram (1982)
 Layam (1982)
 Vidichathum Kothichathum (1982)
 Greeshmajwaala (1981) as Gaurikuttyamma
 Vida Parayum Munpe (1981) as Janaki
 Thenum Vayambum (1981) as Mary Thomas
 Aarathi (1981) as Nurse
 Kathayariyathe (1981) as Lady at the railway station
 Ahimsa (1981) as Vasu's mother
 Arayannam (1981) as  Madhu's mother
 Oothikachiya Ponnu (1981) as Kalyaniyamma
 Sanchaari (1981) as Soudamini
 Munnettam (1981) as Gouriyamma
 Sphodanam (1981) as Muthalali's wife
Swarangal Swapnagal (1981) as Rani
 Thakilu Kottampuram (1981) as Mridula's mother
 Veliyettam (1981) as Lakshmiyamma
 Thaalam Manassinte Thaalam (1981)
 Hamsageetham (1981)
 Arikkari Ammu (1981)
 Avathaaram (1981)
 Paalaattu Kunjikkannan (1980) as Chirutheyi
 Aniyatha Valakal (1980) as Bhargaviyamma
 Lorry (1980) as Ammu
 Kochu Kochu Thettukal (1980) as  Nurse, Latha's sister
 Kadalkattu (1980) as Stella
 Chora Chuvanna Chora (1980) as Kamalakshiyamma
 Ishtamaanu Pakshe (1980) as Rajagopalan's wife
 Kannukal (1979) as Devaki
 Peruvazhiyambalam (1979) as Prabhakaran Pillai's wife
 Ottapettavar (1979)
 Devalokam (1979)
 Bandhanam (1978) as Devakiyamma
 Pathinaalam Raavu (1978) as Umma
 Raappadikalude Gaadha (1978)
 Kadathanattu Maakkam (1978)
 Samayamaayilla Polum (1978)
 Manimuzhakkam (1978)
 Randu Penkuttikal (1978)
 Chuvanna Vithukal	(1977) as Bharathi

Television career

Serials 
 Kudumbasangamam ( sitcom )
Priyankari (Flowers TV)
Chackoyum Maryyum (Mazhavil Manorama)
Arayannangalude Veedu (Flowers TV)
Kuttikale oru Kali Parayam (Kochu TV)
Ammuvinte Amma (Mazhavil Manorama)
Chinthavishtayaya Seetha (Asianet)
Jagratha (Amrita TV)
Bhagyadevatha (TV series) (Mazhavil Manorama)
 Pattu Saree    (Mazhavil Manorama)
 Chattambi Kalyani (Jaihind TV)
Guru (Jaihind TV)
Abhinetri(Surya TV)
Vallarpadathamma(Shalom)
 Nilavillakku (Surya TV)
Pattukalude-Pattu (Surya TV)
Indraneelam (Surya TV)
 Priyam (Kairali TV)
 Gajarajan Guruvayur Keshavan (Surya TV)
Manassariyathe (Surya TV)
Magalude Amma (Surya TV)
Kayamkulam Kochunni (Surya TV)
Swantham Malootty(Surya TV)
 Manasi (Doordarshan)
 Vishudha Thomasleeha (Asianet)
 Alilathali (Asianet)
 Kanal Kireedam (Asianet)
 Omanathingalpakshi (Asianet)
Sthree(Asianet)
Samayam
Agnisakshi 
Melappadam
Sindoorakuruvi
Kashithumbi

Other shows 

 Nanmayude Nakshathrangal(Telefilm)(KAIRALI TV)
 Mazhameghangal (Telefilm)
 Monoottante Onam (Telefilm)(SURYA TV)
 Snehathinte Mullukal(Telefilm)(DD MALAYALAM)
 Cindrella (Telefilm)(DD MALAYALAM)
 The Sacrificial Love  (Telefilm)   (Shalom TV)
 Comedy Festival (Reality Show)(MAZHAVIL MANORAMA)- Supporting Artist
 Oli Mangatha Tharakal (Interview) (SURYA TV)
 Sreevishnumayaarchana (Album), Devasangeetham (Asianet PLUS)
 Kusrithikanna (Album)
 Ente Kanniyathra  (Album)
 Katha Ithuvare
 Riya  Electronic Chalk (Advertisement)
 G- mobile (Advertisement)
 Sarigama - Game show

Dramas
 Prethalayam
 Layabhangam
 Jwalanam

References

External links

Shanthakumari at MSI
 http://www.mallumovies.org/artist/santhakumari
 http://entertainment.oneindia.in/celebs/santhakumari/filmography.html

Kerala State Film Award winners
Actresses in Malayalam cinema
Indian film actresses
Actresses from Kochi
Living people
Indian television actresses
Actresses in Malayalam television
Indian stage actresses
Actresses in Malayalam theatre
20th-century Indian actresses
21st-century Indian actresses
1957 births